1,2-Dimethylcyclopropane is a cycloalkane consisting of a cyclopropane ring substituted with two methyl groups attached to adjacent carbon atoms.  It has three stereoisomers, one cis-isomer and a pair of trans-enantiomers, which differ depending on the orientation of the two methyl groups. As with other cyclopropanes, ring tension results in a relatively unstable compound.

1,2-Dimethylcyclopropane is 1 of 10 structural isomers (cycloalkanes and aliphatic alkenes) which share the general formula of CH, the others being cyclopentane, methylcyclobutane, 1,1-dimethylcyclopropane, ethylcyclopropane, 1-pentene, 2-pentene, 2-methyl-1-butene, 3-methyl-1-butene, and 2-methyl-2-butene.

See also
 Alkyl cycloalkane

References

Cyclopropanes
Hydrocarbons